is a 1994 fighting game developed and published by Sunsoft in Japan for the Super Famicom on March 11, 1994. It is a spin-off of the Hebereke series, as well as Sunsoft's first attempt in the genre before they became better known for the 1995 Galaxy Fight: Universal Warriors, the 1996 Waku Waku 7, and the 1998 Astra Superstars.

Gameplay
Sugoi Hebereke is Bird's Eye-viewed like Vectorbeam's 1979 arcade game Warrior, but with brawling elements similar to the ones found in Atari Games' 1990 Pit-Fighter arcade, Technōs Japan's 1992 Nekketsu Kakutō Densetsu, Namco's 1994 The Outfoxies, and Nintendo's 1999 Super Smash Bros. There are two play modes in the game: story mode and VS. mode. In VS. mode, up to four players can play as the cast of the Hebereke series simultaneously when using an SNES Multitap. The object of the game is to knock out (KO) the other three opponents. Each stage is square shaped and has its own environmental hazards and moving objects.

Release 
On June 25, 1994, Sugoi Heberekes soundtrack was included with the soundtracks of three other titles in the Hebereke series and the Gimmick! soundtrack, all in one album titled , which was published by Datam Polystar and distributed by PolyGram in Japan. The Sugoi Hebereke soundtrack was also included with the soundtracks of two Hebereke titles and Gimmick! in the album , which was published by Wave Master also in Japan on November 30, 2011. The game was re-released on December 18, 2020 via the Nintendo Switch Online SNES app in Japan only.

1994 video games
Hebereke
Mobile games
Sunsoft games
Super Nintendo Entertainment System games
Video games scored by Naoki Kodaka
Video games developed in Japan
Fighting games
Multiplayer and single-player video games
Sugoi Hebereke

Japan-exclusive video games
Nintendo Switch Online games